Hidden Valley Raceway is part of the Hidden Valley Motorsports Complex, located at 171 Hidden Valley Road, Hidden Valley,  from Darwin, Northern Territory, Australia. Hidden Valley Raceway holds an annual round of the International V8 Supercars Championship.

The circuit 
Hidden Valley Raceway is known for its high speeds and fast lap times. In order to win, the race car has to flow well through the sweeping bends and also needs top end horse power for the main straight.

Events
In 2021, AIDRA announced the establishment of an annual Australian Drag Racing Championship series, with ASID as one of five venues across the country to host a round in the inaugural season.

Supercars

V8 Supercars races have been held at Hidden Valley Raceway since 1998, with the first event occurring in July that year. The event is usually held in late June or early July as the temperature is cooler and it is in the 'dry season'. The event is currently called the CrownBet Darwin Triple Crown, with the 'Triple Crown' awarded to the driver who is fastest in the top ten shootout and wins both races. The 2008 event was voted as the V8 Supercar Event of the Year.

Lap records

As of June 2022, the official race lap records at Hidden Valley Raceway are listed as:

Notes

References

External links
Official Website
Darwin V8 Supercars
Trackpedia's guide to racing and riding Hidden Valley

1986 establishments in Australia
Sports venues completed in 1986
Motorsport venues in the Northern Territory
Tourist attractions in Darwin, Northern Territory
Drag racing venues in Australasia
Supercars Championship circuits
Sports venues in Darwin, Northern Territory